Noose (released in the United States as The Silk Noose) is a 1948 British crime film, directed by Edmond T. Gréville and starring Carole Landis, Joseph Calleia, and Derek Farr.

It was shot at Teddington Studios with sets designed by the art director Bernard Robinson.

Plot
Set in the then contemporary post-war London, Noose is the story of black market racketeers who face attempts to bring them to justice by an American fashion journalist, her ex-army fiancé and a gang of honest toughs from a local gym. The normally gentlemanly and urbane Nigel Patrick is cast as a cockney spiv.

The gangs hang around Bason's Gymnasium and Sugiani's nightclub, The Blue Moon. Sugiani has worked his way up from the gutter since arriving in Britain from Italy.

Cast
 Carole Landis as Linda Medbury
 Joseph Calleia as Sugiani
 Derek Farr as Captain Jumbo Holle
 Stanley Holloway as Inspector Rendall
 Nigel Patrick as Bar ("Gorm") Gorman
 John Slater as Pudd'n Bason
 Edward Rigby as Slush
 Leslie Bradley as	Basher
 Reginald Tate as The Editor
 Hay Petrie as The Barber
 Ruth Nixon as Annie Foss
 Carol van Derman as Marcia Lane

Background
Noose was written by Richard Llewellyn, adapted from his own stage play of the same title. The film has been included as part of the cycle of spiv films produced between 1945–50 in Britain.

Reception
Trade papers called the film a "notable box office attraction" in British cinemas in 1948.

Footnotes

External links
  from the British Film Institute
  BBC
Review of film at Variety

1948 films
1948 crime drama films
Film noir
British crime drama films
British black-and-white films
Films set in London
Films shot at Teddington Studios
Films directed by Edmond T. Gréville
1940s English-language films
1940s British films